The 2022 SMU Mustangs football team represented Southern Methodist University in the 2022 NCAA Division I FBS football season. The Mustangs played their home games at Gerald J. Ford Stadium in University Park, Texas, a separate city within the city limits of Dallas, and competed in the American Athletic Conference (The American). They were led by first-year head coach Rhett Lashlee.

Previous season
The 2021 team finished with an overall record of 8–4. The Mustangs went 4–4 in AAC play to finish in sixth place in the conference. The Mustangs were invited to the Fenway Bowl and scheduled to play against Virginia. Virginia had to withdraw from the game due to COVID-19 issues and the bowl was subsequently cancelled.

On November 29, it was announced that head coach Sonny Dykes would be leaving the program to become the head coach at TCU. Rhett Lashlee, who served as SMU's offensive coordinator and quarterbacks coach in 2018 and 2019, was announced as the program's new head coach a day later on November 30.

Preseason

Media poll
The American Athletic Conference media day was held virtually on July 28. The Mustangs were predicted to finish fourth in the conference preseason poll.

Schedule
SMU and The American announced the 2022 football schedule on February 17, 2022.

Schedule Source:

Game summaries

at North Texas

Lamar

at Maryland

TCU

at UCF

Navy

No. 21 Cincinnati

at Tulsa

Houston

The Mustangs defeated the Cougars 77–63, breaking the record for the highest-scoring regulation game in FBS history. SMU quarterback Tanner Mordecai threw for a record 9 touchdowns, 7 of which came in the first half. The Mustangs also broke the school-record for most points in a game, with the previous record being 72.

at South Florida

at No. 21 Tulane

Memphis

vs. BYU (New Mexico Bowl)

Weekly awards
 The American offensive player of the week
Tanner Mordecai (week 9 vs. Houston)

References

SMU
SMU Mustangs football seasons
SMU Mustangs football